Dangerous Curve Ahead is a 1921 American silent comedy starring Helene Chadwick and Richard Dix. The film is considered to be lost.

Plot
As described in a film magazine, Phoebe Mabee (Chadwick) is a much sought after small town belle who quarrels with her fiancé Harley Jones (Dix) after a flirtation with city youth Anson Newton (Flynn). After a period of weepy repentance the engagement is renewed and they are wed. After the children come, there is a hiatus in the domesticity of the couple. Jones is sent aboard by his job and she her children spend the summer at a watering place, where Phoebe meets her city charmer and the romance interrupted by her marriage is renewed. Phoebe develops social ambitions and these are helped along by Newton's aunt Mrs. Nixon (Lester), who is prominent in society and can help Phoebe get her social whirl. Jones the absent husband returns unexpectedly and finds one of the children ill and Phoebe about to keep an appointment to attend a function at Mrs. Nixon's house. Phoebe waivers between fear that failure to attend the function will end her budding social career and the love of her child. She attends the dinner, leaving her child in the care of a nurse, but during the course of the dinner is overcome with remorse, rushes home and arrives just in time to calm the little fellow, who was calling to her. A reconciliation with the husband follows, with motherly love and home responsibilities conquering over social aspirations.

Cast
Helene Chadwick as Phoebe Mabee
Richard Dix as Harley Jones
Maurice 'Lefty' Flynn as Anson Newton
James Neill as Mr. Mabee
Edythe Chapman as Mrs. Mabee
Kate Lester as Mrs. Nixon
Newton Hall as Phoebe's son

See also
List of lost silent films (1920–24)
List of lost films

References

External links 

1921 comedy films
1921 films
American black-and-white films
American silent feature films
Goldwyn Pictures films
Lost American films
Films directed by E. Mason Hopper
Silent American comedy films
1921 lost films
Lost comedy films
1920s American films